Davon Montel Godchaux (born November 11, 1994) is an American football defensive tackle for the New England Patriots of the National Football League (NFL). He played college football at LSU from 2014 to 2016. He was drafted by the Miami Dolphins in the fifth round of the 2017 NFL Draft, and played for the team from 2017 to 2020.

High school career 
A native of Plaquemine, Louisiana, Godchaux attended Plaquemine Senior High School, where he was an All-State defensive lineman. He compiled 60 tackles, 22 tackles for a loss, and 4.5 sacks in his junior season in 2012, which earned him first-team All-State honors for Class 4A. In the season opener of his senior year, he tore his anterior cruciate ligament, causing him to miss the rest of the season. Nonetheless he was honored as a U.S. Army All-American and attended the bowl game.
Regarded as a four-star recruit, Godchaux was ranked as the No. 22 defensive end prospect by ESPN. He chose LSU over offers from Mississippi, Auburn, and UCLA, among others.

College career 
At LSU, Godchaux started 26 games for the Tigers in three seasons. He took over as a starter after three games into his true freshman season in 2014, and he has served as a rotating player at defensive end in LSU’s 3–4 defense. As a junior, Godchaux recorded 62 tackles, 8.5 tackles for loss, 6.5 sacks, one pass defensed, and two fumble recoveries. He declared for the 2017 NFL Draft the day after the 2016 Citrus Bowl.

Professional career

Miami Dolphins
Godchaux pulled a hamstring during the NFL Combine and could not complete all drills.

Godchaux was drafted by the Miami Dolphins in the fifth round, 178th overall, in the 2017 NFL Draft.

Godchaux was placed on the reserve/COVID-19 list by the team on August 5, 2020, and was activated from the list two days later. He was placed on injured reserve on October 16, 2020.

New England Patriots
Godchaux signed a two-year contract with the New England Patriots on March 23, 2021. He signed a contract extension on July 27, 2022.

References

External links 
 
 
 LSU Tigers bio
 Miami Dolphins bio

1994 births
Living people
People from Plaquemine, Louisiana
American football defensive tackles
LSU Tigers football players
Miami Dolphins players
New England Patriots players
Players of American football from Louisiana